David Davies (born 1954, Dunfermline, Scotland) is a British flautist, conductor and composer.

He has held principal positions in the Royal Scottish National Orchestra and the Scottish Opera Orchestra, performed in the UK and internationally, and taught at the Royal Scottish Academy of Music and Drama.

Davies founded the Paragon Ensemble Scotland in 1980, and served as the company's artistic director for twenty years.

References 

British flautists
Scottish conductors (music)
Scottish composers
20th-century classical composers
21st-century classical composers
British music educators
1954 births
Living people
20th-century flautists
21st-century flautists